Wisma Merdeka is a shopping centre located in the city of Kota Kinabalu, Sabah, Malaysia. It is one of the earliest shopping mall in the city, together with Centre Point and Karamunsing Complex.

See also
 List of shopping malls in Malaysia

References

External links
 

Shopping malls in Sabah